The Glossary of fuel cell terms lists the definitions of many terms used within the fuel cell industry. The terms in this fuel cell glossary may be used by fuel cell industry associations, in education material and fuel cell codes and standards to name but a few.

A

 Activation loss
 See overpotential

 Adsorption
 Adsorption is a process that occurs when a  gas or liquid solute accumulates on the surface of a solid or a liquid (adsorbent), forming a film of molecules or atoms (the adsorbate).

 Alkali
 In chemistry, an alkali is a basic, ionic salt of an alkali metal or alkaline earth metal element.

 Alkali anion exchange membrane
 An alkali anion exchange membrane (AAEM) is a semipermeable membrane generally made from ionomers and designed to conduct anions while being impermeable to gases such as oxygen or hydrogen.

 Alkaline fuel cell
 Alkaline fuel cell (AFC) also known as the Bacon fuel cell.

 Alloy
 An alloy is a solid solution or homogeneous mixture of two or more elements, at least one of which is a metal, which itself has metallic properties.

 Alternator
 An alternator is an electromechanical device that converts mechanical energy to alternating current electrical energy.

 Alternating current
 An alternating current (AC) is an electric current which reverses direction cyclically, as opposed to direct current, the direction of which remains constant.

 Ambient Air
 The air surrounding a given object or system.

 Ambient temperature
 Ambient temperature is the temperature within enclosed space.

 Ampere
 The ampere,  in practice often shortened to amp, (symbol: A) is a unit of electric current, or amount of electric charge per second.

 Anion
 A negatively charged ion; an ion that is attracted to the anode.

 Anode
 An anode is an electrode through which electric current flows into a polarized electrical device.

 Aqueous phase reforming
 APR is the production of hydrogen from biomass-derived oxygenated compounds (such as glycerol, sugars and sugar alcohols).

 Artificial membrane
 An artificial membrane, also called a synthetic membrane, is a membrane prepared for separation tasks in laboratory and industry.

 Atmospheric pressure
 Atmospheric pressure is the pressure at any given point in the Earth's atmosphere.

 Atom
 The atom is the smallest unit of an element that retains the chemical properties of that element. An atom has an electron cloud consisting of negatively charged electrons surrounding a dense nucleus.  The nucleus contains positively charged protons and electrically neutral neutrons.

 Autothermal reforming
 Autothermal reforming (ATR) uses oxygen and carbon dioxide or steam in a reaction with methane to form syngas.

 Auxiliary power unit
 An auxiliary power unit (APU) is a device on a vehicle whose purpose is to provide energy for functions other than propulsion.

 Availability factor
 The availability factor of a power plant is the amount of time that it is able to produce electricity over a certain period, divided by the amount of the time in the period.

B

 Back pressure
 Back pressure is the pressure exerted on a moving fluid by obstructions or tight bends in the confinement vessel along which it is moving, such as piping or air vents, against its direction of flow.

 Baffle
 A device or construction used to restrain or regulate, e.g. gas, or a fluid.

 Balance of plant
 Balance of plant (BOP) is the infrastructure of a fuel cell, not including the fuel cells. (See also Mechanical Balance of Plant MBOP and Electrical Balance of Plant EBOP).

 Battery
 In electronics, a battery is a combination of two or more electrochemical cells which store chemical energy and make it available as electrical energy.

 Biofuel
 Biofuel is defined as solid, liquid or gas fuel derived from recently dead biological material and is distinguished from fossil fuels, which are derived from long dead biological material.

 Biogas
 Biogas is a gas produced by the biological breakdown of organic matter in the absence of oxygen.  Biogas originates from biogenic material and is a type of biofuel.

 Bioreactor
 A bioreactor is any device or system that supports a biologically active environment

 Biosensor
 A biosensor is a device for the detection of an analyte that combines a biological component with a physicochemical detector component.

 Bipolar plate
 Bipolar plate, conductive plate in a fuel cell stack that acts as an anode for one cell and a cathode for the adjacent cell. The plate may be made of metal or a conductive polymer (which may be a carbon-filled composite). The plate usually incorporates flow channels for the fluid feeds and may also contain conduits for heat transfer. See also MEA.

 Black start
 A black start is the process of restoring a power station to operation without relying on external energy sources.

 Beta-alumina solid electrolyte
 Beta-alumina solid electrolyte (BASE) is a fast ion conductor material used as a membrane in several types of molten salt electrochemical cell.

 Boiling point
 The boiling point of a liquid is the water temperature at which the vapor pressure of the liquid equals the environmental pressure surrounding the liquid.

 Borax
 Borax, also known as sodium borate, sodium tetraborate, or disodium tetraborate, is an important boron compound, a mineral, and a salt of boric acid.

 British thermal unit
 The mean British thermal unit (BTU) is 1/180 of the heat required to raise the temperature of one pound (454 g) of water from 32°F to 212°F (0°C to 100°C) at a constant atmospheric pressure. It is about equal to the quantity of heat required to raise one pound of water 1°F  (°C).

 Busbar
 In electrical power distribution, a busbar is the strips of copper or aluminium that conduct electricity within a switchboard, fuel cell, distribution board, substation, or other electrical apparatus.

C

 Capacity
 Capacity is the ability to hold, receive or absorb, or a measure thereof, similar to the concept of volume.

 Capacity factor
 The net capacity factor of a power plant is the ratio of the actual output of a power plant over a period of time and its output if it had operated at full nameplate capacity the entire time.

 Capital cost
 Capital cost are costs incurred on the purchase of fuel cells, buildings, construction and equipment to be used in the use of fuel cells or the rendering of it.

 Carbon
 Carbon (C), an atom and primary constituent of hydrocarbon fuels. Carbon is routinely left as a black deposit on engine parts, such as pistons, rings, and valves, by the combustion of fuel.

 Carbon black
 Carbon black is a material produced by the incomplete combustion of heavy petroleum products such as FCC tar, coal tar, ethylene cracking tar, and a small amount from vegetable oil.

 Carbon dioxide
 Carbon dioxide is a chemical compound composed of two oxygen atoms covalently bonded to a single carbon atom.

 Carbon dioxide sensor
 A carbon dioxide sensor (CO2) is an instrument for the measurement of carbon dioxide gas. The most common principles for CO2 sensors are infrared gas sensors (NDIR) and chemical gas sensors.

 Carbon monoxide
 Carbon monoxide, with the chemical formula CO, is a colorless, odorless, tasteless yet highly toxic gas.

 Carbon monoxide detector
 A carbon monoxide detector is a device that detects the presence of the toxic gas carbon monoxide (CO), a colorless and odorless compound produced by incomplete combustion and lethal at high levels.

 Carbon paper
 Carbon paper (originally carbonic paper) is paper coated on one side with a layer of a loosely bound dry ink or pigmented coating, usually bound with wax.

 Carnot cycle
 The Carnot cycle is a particular thermodynamic cycle, modeled on the hypothetical Carnot heat engine.

 Catalysis
 Catalysis is the process in which the rate of a chemical reaction is increased by means of a chemical substance known as a catalyst.

 Catalyst
 A catalyst is a chemical substance that increases the rate of a reaction without being consumed; after the reaction it can potentially be recovered from the reaction mixture chemically unchanged.

 Catalyst poisoning
 Catalyst poisoning is the effect that a catalyst can be 'poisoned' if it reacts with another compound that bonds chemically (similar to an inhibitor) but does not release, or chemically alters the catalyst.

 Catalytic partial oxidation
 In catalytic partial oxidation (CPOX) the use of a catalyst for partial oxidation reduces the required temperature to around 800°C – 900°C.  The choice of reforming technique depends on the sulfur content of the fuel being used.  CPOX can be employed if the sulfur content is below 50 ppm.  A higher sulfur content would poison the catalyst, so the TPOX procedure is used for such fuels.

 Cathode
 A cathode is an electrode through which (positive) electric current flows out of a polarized electrical device.

 Cation
 A cation is a positively charged ion.

 Celsius
 The degree Celsius (°C) is a designation for specific temperatures on the Celsius scale as well as units of increment to indicate a temperature interval (a difference between two temperatures or an uncertainty).

 Centimeter
 A centimetre (American spelling: centimeter, symbol cm) is a unit of length in the metric system, equal to one hundredth of a metre, which is the current SI base unit of length.

 Centrifugal governor
 A centrifugal governor is a specific type of governor that controls the speed by regulating the amount of fuel (or working fluid) admitted, so as to maintain a near constant speed whatever the load or fuel supply conditions.

 Ceramic
 Ceramics are inorganic non-metallic materials formed by the action of heat.

 Cermet
  A cermet is a composite material composed of ceramic (cer) and metallic (met) materials.

 Chemical thermodynamics
 In thermodynamics, chemical thermodynamics is the mathematical study of the interrelation of heat and work with chemical reactions or with a physical change of state within the confines of the laws of thermodynamics.

 Circuit
 A circuit is a closed path formed by the interconnection of electronic components through which an electric current can flow.

 Circuit diagram
 A circuit diagram (also known as an electrical diagram, wiring diagram, elementary diagram, or electronic schematic) is a simplified conventional pictorial representation of an electrical circuit.

 Circulation
 In fluid dynamics, circulation is the line integral around a closed curve of the fluid velocity.

 Climate change
 Climate change is any long-term significant change in the “average weather” that a given region experiences.

 Cogeneration
 Cogeneration (also combined heat and power, CHP) is the use of a heat engine or a power station to simultaneously generate both electricity and useful heat.

 Combustion
  Combustion or burning is a complex sequence of exothermic chemical reactions between a fuel and an oxidant accompanied by the production of heat or both heat and light in the form of either a glow or flames.

 Combustion chamber
 A combustion chamber is the part of an engine in which fuel is burned.

 Composite material
 Composite materials (or composites for short) are engineered materials made from two or more constituent materials with significantly different physical or chemical properties and which remain separate and distinct on a macroscopic level within the finished structure.

 Compressed hydrogen
 Compressed hydrogen (CGH2, CH2 or CH2) is the gaseous state of the element hydrogen which is kept under pressure.

 Compressed natural gas
 Compressed Natural Gas (CNG) is a fossil fuel substitute for gasoline (petrol), diesel, or propane fuel.

 Concentration
 In chemistry, concentration is the measure of how much of a given substance there is mixed with other substances.

 Condensate
 Condensate, the liquid phase produced by the condensation of steam or any other gas

 Condensation
 Condensation is the change of the physical state of aggregation (or simply state) of matter from gaseous phase into liquid phase.

 Condenser
 In systems involving heat transfer, a condenser is a heat exchanger which condenses a substance from its gaseous to its liquid state.

 Contamination
 Contamination is the introduction of material that "does not belong there".

 Coulomb
 The coulomb (symbol: C) is the SI unit of electric charge.

 Countercurrent exchange
 Countercurrent exchange is a mechanism used to transfer some property of a fluid from one flowing current of fluid to another across a semipermeable membrane, conductive material, or free surface (e.g. a liquid–gas absorption or extraction).

 Cryogenic liquefaction
  Cryogenic liquification is the process through which gases such as nitrogen, hydrogen, helium, and natural gas are liquefied under pressure at very low temperatures.

 Current
 see electric current.

 Current collector
 The current collector is the conductive material in a fuel cell that collects electrons (on the anode side) or disburses electrons (on the cathode side). Current collectors are microporous (to allow for fluid flow through them) and lie in between the catalyst/electrolyte surfaces and the bipolar plates.

D

 DC to DC converter
  In electronic engineering, a DC to DC converter is a circuit which converts a source of direct current (DC) from one voltage level to another. It is a class of power converter.

 Density
 The density of a material is defined as its mass per unit volume

 Desiccant
  A desiccant is a hygroscopic substance that induces or sustains a state of dryness (desiccation) in its local vicinity in a moderately-well sealed container.

 Detection limit
 In analytical chemistry, the detection limit, lower limit of detection, or LOD (limit of detection), is the lowest quantity of a substance that can be distinguished from the absence of that substance (a blank value) within a stated confidence limit (generally 1%).

 Dew point
 The dew point (sometimes spelled dewpoint) is the temperature to which a given parcel of air must be cooled, at constant barometric pressure, for water vapor to condense into water.

 Diffusion
 Diffusion is part of transport phenomena. Diffusion is the movement of molecules from a region of higher concentration to one of lower concentration by random molecular motion.

 Direct borohydride fuel cell
 Direct borohydride fuel cell (DBFC) a subcategory of alkaline fuel cells

 Direct carbon fuel cell
  Direct carbon fuel cell (DCFC), a fuel cell that uses a carbonaceous material as a fuel.

 Direct current
 Direct current (DC) is the unidirectional flow of electric charge.

 Direct-ethanol fuel cell
 Direct-ethanol fuel cell (DEFC) a subcategory of Proton-exchange fuel cells where, the fuel, ethanol, is not reformed, but fed directly to the fuel cell.

 Direct methanol fuel cell
 Direct methanol fuel cell (DMFC) subcategory of proton-exchange fuel cells where the methanol (CH3OH) fuel is not reformed as in the indirect methanol fuel cell, but fed directly to the fuel cell

 Dispersion
 Dispersion, in fluid dynamics is dispersive mass transfer, which is the spreading of mass from areas of high to low concentration

 Distributed Generation
 Distributed generation, also  called on-site generation, dispersed generation, embedded generation, decentralized generation, decentralized energy or distributed energy,  generates electricity from many small energy sources.

 Doping
 In semiconductor production, doping is the process of intentionally introducing impurities into an extremely pure (also referred to as intrinsic) semiconductor in order to change its electrical properties.

 Downtime
 Downtime or outage is a period of time or a percentage of a timespan that a system is unavailable or offline.

 Dry basis
 It is customary to report the product composition data in steam reforming reactions on a steam free basis (dry basis) since the steam is not a constituent in any of the synthesis gases produced or in the reformed gas when used as a fuel; however, if steam is to be considered in the product composition data as well, then the calculation would be wet basis.

E

 Effluent
 Effluent is an outflowing of water from a natural body of water, or from a man-made structure.

 Electrical Balance of Plant
 Electrical Balance of Plant (EBOP), the user interface panel, control equipment, and converting the fuel cell DC power to AC power.

 Electricity
 Electricity is any phenomenon resulting from the presence and flow of electric charge.

 Electrical conductivity
 Electrical conductivity or specific conductivity is a measure of a material's ability to conduct an electric current.

 Electrical efficiency
 The electrical efficiency of an entity (a device, component, or system) in electronics and electrical engineering is defined as useful power output divided by the total electrical power consumed (a fractional expression), typically denoted by the Greek letter small Eta (η).

 Electrical insulation
 An electrical insulator is a material that resists the flow of electric current.  It is an object intended to support or separate electrical conductors without passing current through itself.

 Electrical resistance
 Electrical resistance is a ratio of the degree to which an object opposes an electric current through it, measured in Ohms.

 Electric circuit
 An electrical circuit is a network that has a closed loop, giving a return path for the current. A network is a connection of two or more components, and may not necessarily be a circuit.

 Electric current
 Electric current is the flow (movement) of electric charge. The SI unit of electric current is the ampere.

 Electricity generation
 Electricity generation is the process of converting non-electrical energy to electricity.

 Electric power conversion
 In electrical engineering, power conversion has a more specific meaning, namely converting electric power from one form to another.

 Electrochemistry
 Electrochemistry is a branch of chemistry that studies chemical reactions which take place in a solution at the interface of an electron conductor (a metal or a semiconductor) and an ionic conductor (the electrolyte), and which involve electron transfer between the electrode and the electrolyte or species in solution.

 Electrochemical cell
An electrochemical cell is a device used for generating an electromotive force (voltage) and current from chemical reactions.

 Electrochemical gas sensor
 Electrochemical gas sensors are gas detectors that measure the volume of a target gas by oxidizing or reducing the target gas at an electrode and measuring the resulting current.

 Electrode
 An electrode is an electrical conductor used to make contact with a nonmetallic part of a circuit (e.g. a semiconductor, an electrolyte or a vacuum).

 Electro-galvanic fuel cell
 Electro-galvanic fuel cell (EGFC)an electrical device used to measure the concentration of oxygen gas in scuba diving and medical equipment.

 Electroosmotic flow
 Electroosmotic flow (or Electro-osmotic flow, often abbreviated EOF) is the motion of liquid induced by an applied potential across a capillary tube or microchannel. Electroosmotic flow is an essential component in chemical separation techniques,  notably capillary electrophoresis.

 Electroosmotic pump
 An electroosmotic pump (EOP), or EO pump, is used for removing liquid flooding water from channels and gas diffusion layers and direct hydration of the proton exchange membrane in the membrane electrode assembly (MEA) of the proton exchange membrane fuel cell

 Electrolysis
 In chemistry and manufacturing, electrolysis is a method of separating chemically bonded elements and compounds by passing an electric current through them.

 Electrolyte
 An electrolyte is any substance containing free ions that behaves as an electrically conductive medium.

 Electron
 The electron is a fundamental subatomic particle that carries a negative electric charge.

 Emission
 Emission of air pollutants

 Emission standard
 Emission standards are requirements that set specific limits to the amount of pollutants that can be released into the environment.

 Endothermic
 In thermodynamics, the endothermic processes or reactions are those that absorb energy in the form of heat.

 Energy
 In physics and other sciences, energy is a scalar physical quantity that is a property of objects and systems which is conserved by nature. Energy is often defined as the ability to do work.

 Energy carrier
 An energy carrier is a substance or phenomenon that can be used to produce mechanical work or heat or to operate chemical or physical processes (ISO 13600).

 Energy content
 Amount of energy for a given weight of fuel. see also energy density

 Energy security
 Energy security

 Energy storage
 Energy storage is the storing of some form of energy that can be drawn upon at a later time to perform some useful operation.

 Engine
 An engine is a machine that converts heat energy into mechanical energy.

 Energy conversion efficiency
 Energy conversion efficiency is the ratio between the useful output of an energy conversion machine and the input, in energy terms.

 Energy density
 Energy density is the amount of energy stored in a given system or region of space per unit volume, or per unit mass, depending on the context, although the latter is more formally specific energy

 Energy transformation
 In physics and engineering, energy transformation or energy conversion, is any process of transforming one form of energy to another.

 Enthalpy
 In thermodynamics and molecular chemistry, the enthalpy or heat content (denoted as H, h, or rarely as χ) is a quotient or description of thermodynamic potential of a system that can be used to calculate the "useful" work obtainable from a closed thermodynamic system under constant pressure and entropy.

 Enthalpy of vaporization
 The enthalpy of vaporization, (symbol ), also known as the heat of vaporization or heat of evaporation, is the energy required to transform a given quantity of a substance into a gas.

 Ethanol
 Ethanol, also called ethyl alcohol, grain alcohol, or drinking alcohol, is a volatile, flammable, colorless liquid.

 Evaporation
 Evaporation is the process by which molecules in a liquid state (e.g. water) spontaneously become gaseous (e.g. water vapor).

 Exergy
 In thermodynamics, the exergy of a system is the maximum work possible during a process that brings the system into equilibrium with a heat reservoir.

 Exergy efficiency
 Exergy efficiency (also known as the second-law efficiency or rational efficiency) computes the efficiency of a process taking the second law of thermodynamics into account.

 Exhaust gas
 Exhaust gas is flue gas which occurs as a result of the combustion of fuels such as natural gas, gasoline/petrol, diesel, fuel oil or coal. It is discharged into the atmosphere through an exhaust pipe or flue gas stack.

 Exothermic
 In thermodynamics, exothermic processes or reactions are those that release energy, usually in the form of heat but also in the form of light (e.g. explosions), sound, or electricity.

 Expansion ratio
 Expansion ratio is used in the context of liquefied and cryogenic substances. The expansion ratio of a substance is the volume of a given amount of that substance in liquid form compared to the volume of the same amount of substance in gaseous form, at a given temperature.

F

 Fan
 A mechanical fan is an electrically powered device used to produce an airflow for the purpose of creature comfort (particularly in the heat), ventilation, exhaust, or any other gaseous transport.

 Fahrenheit
 Fahrenheit is a temperature scale. In this scale, the freezing point of water is 32 degrees Fahrenheit (°F) and the boiling point 212 °F

 Failure mode and effects analysis
 A failure mode and effects analysis (FMEA) is a procedure for analysis of potential failure modes within a system for classification by severity or determination of the effect of failures on the system.

 FCEV
 A Fuel Cell Electric Vehicle is a Fuel cell vehicle that has a battery it can charge from an external source as well as from its on-board fuel cell.

 FCV
 Fuel cell vehicle

 Feedstock purification
 Feedstock purification, The process of removing poisons like sulfur (S) and chloride (Cl) from the feedstock.

 Flammability
 Flammability is the ease with which a substance will ignite, causing fire or combustion.

 Flammability limit
 Flammability limits, also called flammable limits, give the proportion of combustible gases in a mixture, between which limits this mixture is flammable.

 Flash point
 The flash point of a flammable liquid is the lowest temperature at which it can form an ignitable mixture in air.

 Float valve
 A float valve is a mechanical feedback mechanism that regulates fluid level by using a float to drive an inlet valve so that a higher fluid level will force the valve closed while a lower fluid level will force the valve open.

 Flow battery
 Flow battery (FB) a form of rechargeable battery in which electrolyte containing one or more dissolved electroactive species flows through a power cell / reactor that converts chemical energy to electricity.

 Flow measurement
 Flow measurement is the quantification of bulk fluid movement.  It can be measured in a variety of ways.

 Flue gas
 Flue gas is gas that exits to the atmosphere via a flue.

 Flue-gas desulfurization
 Flue-gas desulfurization (FGD)  is the technology used for removing sulfur dioxide (SO2) from the exhaust flue gases.

 Fluid dynamics
 Fluid dynamics is the sub-discipline of fluid mechanics dealing with fluid flow: fluids (liquids and gases) in motion.

 Fluid mechanics
 Fluid mechanics is the study of how fluids move and the forces on them.  (Fluids include liquids and gases.)  Fluid mechanics can be divided into fluid statics, the study of fluids at rest, and fluid dynamics, the study of fluids in motion.

 Flux
 In the study of transport phenomena (heat transfer, mass transfer and fluid dynamics), flux is defined as the amount that flows through a unit area per unit time.

 Formic acid
 Formic acid (systematically called methanoic acid) is the simplest carboxylic acid. Its formula is HCOOH or CH2O2.

 Formic acid fuel cell
 Formic acid fuel cell (DFAFC), a subcategory of proton-exchange fuel cells where, the fuel, formic acid, is not reformed, but fed directly to the fuel cell.

 Fossil fuel
 Fossil fuels or mineral fuels are fossil source fuels, that is, hydrocarbons found within the top layer of the Earth’s crust.

 Fouling
 Fouling is the accumulation of unwanted material on solid surfaces,

 Frequency changer
 A frequency changer or frequency converter is an electronic device that converts alternating current (AC) of one frequency to alternating current of another frequency.

 Fuel
 Fuel is any material that is burned or altered in order to obtain energy.

 Fuel cell
 A fuel cell (FC) is an electrochemical conversion device.

 Fuel cell poisoning
 The lowering of a fuel cell's efficiency due to impurities in the fuel binding to the catalyst.  See catalyst poisoning.

 Fuel cell vehicle
 A fuel cell vehicle is any vehicle that uses a fuel cell to produce its on-board motive power.

 Fuel efficiency
 Fuel efficiency, in its basic sense, is the same as thermal efficiency, meaning the efficiency of a process that converts chemical potential energy contained in a carrier fuel into kinetic energy or work.

 Fuel efficiency in transportation
 Fuel efficiency in transportation

 Fuel processor
 Device used to generate hydrogen from fuels such as natural gas, propane, gasoline, methanol, and ethanol, for use in fuel cells.

 Fuel processing system
 Fuel processing system (FPS)

 Fuel pump
 Fuel pump

 Fusible plug
 A fusible plug is a threaded metal plug, usually made out of bronze, brass, or gunmetal.

G

 Gadolinium doped ceria
 Gadolinium doped ceria (GDC) – (for SOFC)

 Gas
 Fuel gas, such as natural gas, undiluted liquefied petroleum gases (vapor phase only), liquefied petroleum gas–air mixtures, or mixtures of these gases.
 Liquefied petroleum gases (LPG) as used in this standard, shall mean and include any material which is composed predominantly of any of the following hydrocarbons, or mixtures of them: propane, propylene, butanes (normal butane or isobutane) and butylenes.
 LP gas–air mixture – Liquefied petroleum gases distributed at relatively low pressures and normal atmospheric temperatures which have been diluted with air to produce desired heating value and utilization characteristics.
 Natural gas – Mixtures of hydrocarbon gases and vapors consisting principally of methane (CH4) in gaseous form.

 Gas compressor
 A gas compressor is a mechanical device that increases the pressure of a gas by reducing its volume.

 Gas detector
 A gas detector is a device which detects the presence of various gases within an area, usually as part of a system to warn about gases which might be harmful to humans or animals.

 Gas diffusion
 Mixing of two gases caused by random molecular motions. Gases diffuse very quickly; liquids diffuse much more slowly, and solids diffuse at very slow (but often measurable) rates. Molecular collisions make diffusion slower in liquids and solids.

 Gas diffusion electrode
 Gas diffusion electrodes are electrodes with a conjunction of a solid, liquid and gaseous interface, and an electrical conducting catalyst supporting an electrochemical reaction between the liquid and the gaseous phase.

 Gasification
 Gasification is a process that converts carbonaceous materials, such as coal, petroleum, or biomass, into carbon monoxide and hydrogen by reacting the raw material at high temperatures with a controlled amount of oxygen and/or steam.

 Gasoline gallon equivalent
 Gasoline gallon equivalent (GGE) or gasoline-equivalent gallon (GEG) is the amount of alternative fuel it takes to equal the energy content of one liquid gallon of gasoline.

 Gibbs free energy
 In thermodynamics, the Gibbs free energy (IUPAC recommended name: Gibbs energy or Gibbs function) is a thermodynamic potential which measures the "useful" or process-initiating work obtainable from an isothermal, isobaric thermodynamic system.

 Graphite
 The mineral graphite, as with diamond and fullerene, is one of the allotropes of carbon.

 Greenhouse effect
 Gases in the Earth's atmosphere that contribute to the greenhouse effect, effectively absorbing thermal infrared radiation, emitted by the  Earth’s surface

 Greenhouse gases
 Warming of the Earth's atmosphere due to greenhouse gases in the atmosphere that allow solar radiation (visible, ultraviolet) to reach the Earth's atmosphere but do not allow the emitted infrared radiation to pass back out of the Earth's atmosphere.

 Grid connection
 Grid connection

 Grid-tied electrical system
 A grid-tied electrical system, also called Tied to grid  or Grid tie system, is a semi-autonomous electrical generation or grid energy storage system which links to the mains to feed excess capacity back to the local mains electrical grid.

 Grid tie inverter
 Grid tie inverter

 Guard bed
 Guard bed, see guard catalyst bed and liquid-phase guard bed.

 Guard catalyst bed
 A guard catalyst bed is a fixed bed of pellets of the same catalytic material, see fixed bed reactor.

H

 Half-reaction
 A half reaction is either the oxidation or reduction reaction component of a redox reaction.

 Heat exchanger
 A heat exchanger is a device built for efficient heat transfer from one medium to another, whether the media are separated by a solid wall so that they never mix, or the media are in direct contact.

 Heat pipe
 A heat pipe is a heat transfer mechanism that can transport large quantities of heat with a very small difference in temperature between the hotter and colder interfaces.

 Heat transfer
 In thermal physics, heat transfer is the passage of thermal energy from a hot to a colder body.

 Heating value
 The heating value (TOTAL) (ΔHc0) is the energy released as heat when a compound undergoes complete combustion with oxygen. (see also Higher heating value (HHV) and Lower heating value) (LHV).

 Heat of combustion
 The heat of combustion (ΔHc0) is the energy released as heat when a compound undergoes complete combustion with oxygen. The chemical reaction is typically a hydrocarbon reacting with oxygen to form carbon dioxide, water and heat.

 Higher heating value
 The higher heating value (HHV) (also known as the gross calorific value or gross energy) of a fuel is defined as the amount of heat released by a specified quantity (initially at 25 °C) once it is combusted and the products have returned to a temperature of 25 °C.

 High-temperature shift
 High-temperature shift (HTS), the water gas shift reaction at 350 °C (662 °F) in the presence of a metal-based catalyst (nickel)

 Hybrid electric vehicle
 A hybrid electric vehicle (HEV) is a hybrid vehicle which combines a conventional propulsion system with a rechargeable energy storage system (RESS) to achieve better fuel economy than a conventional vehicle.

 Hydride
 Hydride is the name given to the negative ion of hydrogen, H−.

 Hydride ion
 Aside from electride, the hydride ion is the simplest possible anion, consisting of two electrons and a proton. See also hydrogen anion

 Hydrocarbon
 In organic chemistry, a hydrocarbon (HC) is an organic compound consisting entirely of hydrogen and carbon.

 Hydrocarbon dew point
 The hydrocarbon dew point (HDP) or (HCDP) is the temperature (at a given  pressure) at which the hydrocarbon components of any hydrocarbon-rich gas mixture, such as natural gas, will start to condense out of the gaseous phase.

 Hydrodesulfurization
 Hydrodesulfurization (HDS) is a catalytic chemical process widely used to remove sulfur (S) from natural gas and from refined petroleum products such as gasoline or petrol, jet fuel, kerosene, diesel fuel, and fuel oils.

 Hydrogen
 Hydrogen is the chemical element with atomic number 1. It is represented by the symbol H. At standard temperature and pressure, hydrogen is a colorless, odorless, nonmetallic, tasteless, highly flammable diatomic gas with the molecular formula H2.

 Hydrogen anion
 The hydrogen anion is a negative hydrogen ion, H−. See also hydride ion.

 Hydrogen purity
 Hydrogen purity or hydrogen quality is the lack of impurities in hydrogen as a fuel gas.

 Hydrogen-rich fuel
 A fuel that contains a significant amount of hydrogen, such as gasoline, diesel fuel, methanol (CH3OH), ethanol (CH3CH2OH), natural gas, and coal.

 Hydrogen sulfide sensor
 A hydrogen sulfide sensor or H2S sensor is a gas sensor for the measurement of hydrogen sulfide in a gas stream.

I

 Impurity
 Impurities are substances inside a confined amount of liquid, gas, or solid, which differ from the chemical composition of the material or compound.

 Influent
  Influent

 Interlock
 Interlocking is a method of preventing undesired states in a state machine, which in a general sense can include any electrical, electronic, or mechanical device or system.

 Internal combustion engine
 An internal combustion engine (ICE) is an engine in which the combustion of fuel and an oxidizer (typically air) occurs in a confined space called a combustion chamber.

 Inverter
  An inverter is an electrical or electro-mechanical device that converts direct current (DC) to alternating current (AC)

 Ion
 An ion is an atom or molecule which has lost or gained one or more valence electrons, giving it a positive or negative electrical charge.

 Ion exchange
 Ion exchange is an exchange of ions between two electrolytes or between an electrolyte solution and a complex.

 Ion-exchange resin
 An ion-exchange resin is an insoluble matrix (or support structure) normally in the form of small (1–2 mm diameter) beads, usually white or yellowish, fabricated from an organic polymer substrate.

 Ionomer
 An ionomer is a polyelectrolyte that comprises copolymers containing both electrically neutral repeating units and a fraction of ionized units

 Islanding
 Islanding is the condition of a distributed Generation (DG) generator continuing to power a location even though power from the electric utility is no longer present.

J

K

 Kröger–Vink notation
 Kröger–Vink notation is set of conventions used to describe electrical charge and lattice position for point defect species in crystals.

 Kilogram
 The kilogram or kilogramme (symbol: kg) is the base unit of mass in the International System of Units (known also by its French-language initials “SI”). The kilogram is almost exactly equal to the mass of one liter of water.

 Kilowatt
 The kilowatt (symbol: kW), equal to one thousand watts, is typically used to state the power output of engines and the power consumption of tools and machines.

 Kilowatt hour
 The kilowatt hour, also written kilowatt-hour (symbol kW·h, kW h or kWh) is a unit of energy.

L

 Landfill gas
 landfill gas (LFG), see biogas.

 Lanthanum carbonate
 Lanthanum carbonate is used as a lanthanum source for solid-state production of lanthanum strontium manganite (LSM), primarily for solid oxide fuel cell applications.

  LH2
 See liquid hydrogen.

 Life cycle assessment
 A life cycle assessment (LCA, also known as life cycle analysis, ecobalance, and cradle-to-grave analysis) is the investigation and valuation of the environmental impacts of a given product or service caused or necessitated by its existence.

 Linear regulator
 In electronics, a linear regulator is a voltage regulator based on an active device (such as a bipolar junction transistor, field effect transistor or vacuum tube) operating in its "linear region"

 Liquid
 liquid is one of the principal states of matter.

 Liquid hydrogen
 Liquid hydrogen (LH2 or LH2) is the liquid state of the element hydrogen.

 Liquid–liquid extraction
 Liquid–liquid extraction, also known as solvent extraction and partitioning, is a method to separate compounds based on their relative solubilities in two different immiscible liquids, usually water and an organic solvent.

 Liquefied natural gas
 Liquefied natural gas (LNG) is natural gas (primarily methane, CH4) that has been converted to liquid form for ease of storage or transport.

 Liquefied petroleum gas
 Liquefied petroleum gas (also called LPG, GPL, LP Gas, or autogas) is a mixture of hydrocarbon gases used as a fuel in heating appliances and vehicles

 Liquefaction
 In physics, to liquefy (sometimes spelled as "liquify") means to turn something into the liquid state.

 Liquefaction of gases
 Liquefaction of gases includes a number of phases used to convert a gas into a liquid state.

 List of chemical purification methods in chemistry
 Purification in a chemical context is the physical separation of a chemical substance of interest from foreign or contaminating substances.  The following list of chemical purification methods should not be considered exhaustive.

 Load following power plant
 A load following power plant is a power plant that adjusts its power output as demand for electricity fluctuates throughout the day.

 Load profile
 In electrical engineering, a load profile is a graph of the variation in the electrical load versus time.

 Lower flammability limit
 Lower flammability limit (LFL), usually expressed in volume per cent, is the lower end of the concentration range of a flammable solvent at a given temperature and pressure for which air/vapor mixtures can ignite.

 Lower heating value
 The lower heating value (also known as net calorific value, net CV, or LHV) of a fuel is defined as the amount of heat released by combusting a specified quantity (initially at 25 °C or another reference state) and returning the temperature of the combustion products to 150 °C.

 Low temperature shift
 Low temperature shift (LTS), the water gas shift reaction at 190–210°C (374–410°F) in the presence of a metal-based catalyst (nickel).

M

 Maintenance, repair and operation cost
 Maintenance, Repair and Operation Cost or Maintenance, Repair and Overhaul (MRO) is fixing any sort of mechanical or electrical device should it become out of order or broken (repair) as well as performing the routine actions which keep the device in working order (maintenance) or prevent trouble from arising (preventive maintenance).

 Mass flow sensor
 A mass flow sensor (MAF) responds to the amount of a fluid (usually a gas) flowing through a chamber containing the sensor.

 Maximum allowable operating pressure
 Maximum allowable operating pressure (MAOP) is the wall strength of a pressurized cylinder such as a pipeline or storage tank and how much pressure the walls may safely hold before rupturing.

 Mean down time
 In organizational management, mean down time (MDT) is the average time that a system is non-operational.

 Mean time between failures
 Mean time between failures (MTBF) is the mean (average) time between failures of a system, and is often attributed to the "useful life" of the device i.e. not including 'infant mortality' or 'end of life' if the device is not repairable.

 Mean time between outages
 In a system the mean time between outages (MTBO) is the mean time between equipment failures that result in loss of system continuity or unacceptable degradation.

 Mechanical energy
 In physics, mechanical energy is the potential energy and kinetic energy present in the components of a mechanical system.

 Mechanical Balance of Plant
 Mechanical Balance of Plant (MBOP), the process equipment needed to provide steam, gas, and air to the fuel cell stack.

 Membrane
 See semipermeable membrane and artificial membrane

 Membrane electrode assembly
 Membrane electrode assembly (MEA) is an assembled stack of proton exchange membranes.

 Megawatt
 The megawatt (symbol: MW) is equal to one million (1000000) watts.

 Meter
 Meter (m), Basic metric unit of length equal to 3.28 feet, 1.09 yards or 39.37 inches. Related units are the decimeter (dm) at 10 per meter, the centimeter (cm) at 100 per meter, the millimeter (mm) at 1000 per meter and the kilometer (km) at 1000 meters.

 Methanation
 Methanation is a physical-chemical process to generate Methane from a mixture of various gases out of biomass fermentation or thermo-chemical gasification.

 Methane
 Methane is a chemical compound with the molecular formula . It is the simplest alkane, and the principal component of natural gas.

 Methane reformer
 A methane reformer is a device used in chemical engineering, which can produce pure hydrogen gas from natural gas using a catalyst. (See ATR and SMR).

 Methanol
 Methanol, also known as methyl alcohol, carbinol, wood alcohol, wood naphtha or wood spirits, is a chemical compound with chemical formula CH3OH (often abbreviated MeOH).

 Methanol reformer
 A methanol reformer is a device used in chemical engineering, especially in the area of fuel cell technology, which can produce pure hydrogen gas and carbon dioxide by reacting a methanol and water (steam) mixture.

 MicroCHP
 "Micro cogeneration" or micro combined heat and power (mCHP) is a so called distributed energy resource (DER).

 Microbial fuel cell
 Microbial fuel cell (MFC) or biological fuel cell is a bio-electrochemical system that drives a current by mimicking bacterial interactions found in nature.

 Micropump
 A micropump is a small pump, particularly one with functional dimensions in the micrometre range.

 Miles per gallon equivalent
 Miles per gallon of gasoline equivalent (MPGe) is a unit of measurement that relates efficiencies of different systems to the traditional unit of measurement for fuel efficiency (miles per gallon of gasoline).

 Millimeter
 Millimeter (mm), Metric unit of length, equal to 0.04 inch (there are 25 mm in an inch). There are 1000 millimeters in a meter.

 Milliwatt
 Milliwatt (mW), A unit of power equal to one-thousandth of a watt.

 Molten-carbonate fuel cells
 Molten-carbonate fuel cells (MCFCs) are high-temperature fuel cells

N

 Nafion
 Nafion is a sulfonated tetrafluoroethylene copolymer

 Nano iron powder
 Nano iron powder is an iron powder with granules' sizes ranging on the nanoscale.

 Nanowire
 A nanowire is a wire of diameter of the order of a nanometer (10−9 meters).

 Natural gas
 Natural gas is a gaseous fossil fuel consisting primarily of methane but including significant quantities of ethane, propane, butane, and pentane—heavier hydrocarbons removed prior to use as a consumer fuel —as well as carbon dioxide, nitrogen, helium and hydrogen sulfide.

 Nernst equation
 In electrochemistry, the Nernst equation is an equation which can be used (in conjunction with other information) to determine the equilibrium reduction potential of a half-cell in an electrochemical cell.

 Net energy gain
 In energy economics, net energy gain (NEG) is a surplus condition in the difference between the energy required to harvest an energy source and the energy provided by that same source.

 Nickel
 Nickel is a metallic chemical element with the symbol Ni and atomic number 28.

 Nitrogen
 Nitrogen N2 a chemical element that has the symbol N and atomic number 7 and atomic weight 14.0067. Molecular nitrogen (N2) is a colorless, odorless, tasteless and mostly inert diatomic gas at standard conditions, constituting 78.08% by volume of Earth's atmosphere.

 Nitrogen oxide
 Nitrogen oxide (NOx) is any binary compound of oxygen and nitrogen or a mixture of such compounds

 Nitrogen oxide sensor
 A nitrogen oxide sensor or NOx sensor is typically a high temperature device built to detect nitrogen oxides in combustion environments such as an automobile or truck tailpipe or a smokestack.

O

 Off board reforming
 Off board reforming, stationary reforming, see steam reforming, methane reformer, methanol reformer

 Ohm
 The ohm (symbol: Ω) is the SI unit of electrical impedance or, in the direct current case, electrical resistance, named after Georg Ohm.

 Onboard reforming
 On-board reforming, reforming on board a vehicle, see steam reforming, methane reformer, methanol reformer

 Open-circuit voltage
 Open-circuit voltage or OCV is the difference of electrical potential between two terminals of a device when there is no external load connected, i.e. the circuit is broken or open.

 Original equipment manufacturer
 An original equipment manufacturer, or OEM is typically a company that uses a component made by a second company in its own product, or sells the product of the second company under its own brand.

 Output impedance
 Output impedance, Any linear electronic circuit or device which supplies a current may be modelled as an ideal voltage source in series with an impedance. This is helpful in analysing the voltage drop which occurs as current is drawn.

 Overpotential
 In electrochemistry, overpotential is the difference in the electric potential of an electrode with no current through it, at equilibrium, and with a current.

 Overpressure
 Overpressure

 Overvoltage
 When the voltage in a circuit or part of it is raised above its upper design limit, this is known as overvoltage.

 Oxidant
 An oxidizing agent (also called an oxidant or oxidizer) can be defined as either: a chemical compound that readily transfers oxygen atoms, or a substance that gains electrons in a redox chemical reaction. In both cases, the oxidizing agent becomes reduced in the process.

 Oxidation
 See redox

 Oxygen
 Oxygen is the element with atomic number 8 and represented by the symbol O.

 Oxygen sensor
 An oxygen sensor, or lambda sensor, is an electronic device that measures the proportion of oxygen (O2) in the gas or liquid being analyzed.

P

 Palladium
 Palladium is a rare and lustrous silvery-white metal with the symbol Pd, and its atomic number is 46.

 Parallel circuit
 Parallel circuit, if two or more components are connected in parallel they have the same potential difference (voltage) across their ends.  The potential differences across the components are the same in magnitude, and they also have identical polarities. Hence, the same voltage is applicable to all circuit components connected in parallel.

 Partial oxidation
 In chemistry, a partial oxidation (POX) reaction occurs when a substoichiometric fuel-air mixture is partially combusted in a reformer.

 Partial pressure
 In a mixture of ideal gases, each gas has a partial pressure which is the pressure which the gas would have if it alone occupied the volume. The total pressure of a gas mixture is the sum of the partial pressures of each individual gas in the mixture.

 Particulate
 Particulates, alternatively referred to as particulate matter (PM) or fine particles, are tiny particles of solid or liquid suspended in a gas.

 Parts per million
 Parts per million (ppm) denotes the amount of a given substance in a total amount of 1,000,000 regardless of the units of measure used as long as they are the same. e.g. 1 milligram per kilogram. 1 part in 106.

 Parts per million by volume
 In atmospheric chemistry and in air pollution regulations, the parts per notation is commonly expressed with a v following, such as ppmv, to indicate parts per million by volume.

 Pascal
 The pascal (symbol: Pa) is the SI derived unit of pressure, stress, Young's modulus and tensile strength. It is a measure of perpendicular force per unit area i.e. equivalent to one newton per square meter or one joule per cubic metre.

 Peak load
 Peak load

 PEDOT
 Poly(3,4-ethylenedioxythiophene) or PEDOT (or sometimes PEDT)  is a conducting polymer based on 3,4-ethylenedioxylthiophene or EDOT monomer.

 Permeation
 Permeation, in physics and engineering, is the penetration of a permeate (such as a liquid, gas, or vapor)  through a solid, and is related to a material's intrinsic permeability. Permeability is tested by permeation measurement.

 Phase transition
 In thermodynamics, phase transition or phase change is the transformation of a thermodynamic system from one phase to another.

 Phosphoric acid
 Phosphoric acid, also known as orthophosphoric acid or phosphoric(V) acid, is a mineral (inorganic) acid having the chemical formula H3PO4.

 Phosphoric acid fuel cell
 Phosphoric acid fuel cell (PAFC), a type of fuel cell that uses liquid phosphoric acid as an electrolyte.

 Photoelectrochemical cell
  Photoelectrochemical cell (PEC), a solar cell that extracts electrical energy from light, including visible light.

 Platinum
 Platinum is a chemical element with the atomic symbol Pt

 Polybenzimidazole fiber
 Polybenzimidazole (PBI) fiber (1983) is a synthetic fiber with an extremely high melting point that also does not ignite.

 Polyethylene
 Polyethylene or polythene (IUPAC name poly(ethene)) is a thermoplastic commodity

 Polymer
 A polymer is a large molecule (macromolecule) composed of repeating structural units connected by covalent chemical bonds. See also plastic.

 Polymer electrolyte membrane
 A polymer electrolyte membrane (PEM), is a fuel cell incorporating a solid polymer membrane used as its electrolyte. Protons (H+) are transported from the anode to the cathode. The operating temperature range is generally 60–100°C.

 Polytetrafluoroethylene
 In chemistry, poly(tetrafluoroethene) or poly(tetrafluoroethylene) (PTFE) is a synthetic fluoropolymer which finds numerous applications.

 Polymer electrolyte membrane fuel cell
 Polymer electrolyte membrane fuel cell (PEMFC or PEFC), a type of acid-based fuel cell in which the transport of protons (H+) from the anode to the cathode is through a solid, aqueous membrane impregnated with an appropriate acid. The electrolyte is a called a polymer electrolyte membrane (PEM). The fuel cells typically run at low temperatures (<100°C).

 Potential difference
 In physics, the potential difference or p.d. between two points is the difference of the points' scalar potential,  equivalent to the  line integral of the field strength between the two points.

 Portable fuel cell applications
 Portable fuel cell applications (or portable fuel cell power systems) are portable (Movable) fuel cell applications

 Potassium hydroxide
 Potassium hydroxide is the inorganic compound with the formula KOH.

 Power
 In physics, power (symbol: P) is the rate at which work is performed or energy is transmitted, or the amount of energy required or expended for a given unit of time.

 Power density
 Power density (Pv), see specific power

 Power factor
 The power factor of an AC electric power system is defined as the ratio of the real power to the apparent power, and is a number between 0 and 1 (frequently expressed as a percentage, e.g. 0.5 pf = 50% pf).

 Power supply
 Power supply is a source of electrical power.

 Power-to-weight ratio
 Power-to-weight ratio (specific power) is a calculation commonly applied to engines and other mobile power sources to enable the comparison of one unit or design to another.

 Power per unit of mass
  Power per unit of mass is the power-to-weight ratio, measured in kilowatts per kilogram (generally, kW/kg).

 PReferential OXidation
 Preferential oxidation (PROX) is the preferential oxidation of a gas on a catalyst.

 Pressure regulator
 A pressure regulator is a valve that automatically cuts off the flow of a liquid or gas at a certain pressure.

 Pressure relief valve
 A pressure relief valve (PRV), also called a pressure safety valve (PSV), is a safety device that relieves in case of overpressure in vessel or piping.

 Pressure sensor
 A pressure sensor measures the pressure, typically of gases or liquids.

 Pressure swing adsorption
 Pressure Swing Adsorption (PSA) is a technology used to separate some gas species from a mixture of gases under pressure according to the species' molecular characteristics and affinity for an adsorbent material.

 Pressure vessel
 A pressure vessel is a closed container designed to hold gases or liquids at a pressure different from the ambient pressure.

 Propane
 Propane is  a three-carbon alkane, normally a gas, but compressible to a liquid that is transportable. See also LPG.

 Proton
 The proton is a subatomic particle with an electric charge of one positive fundamental unit

 Proton exchange membrane
 Proton exchange membrane (PEM) is a semipermeable membrane generally made from ionomers and designed to conduct protons while being impermeable to gases such as oxygen or hydrogen.

 Proton exchange membrane fuel cell
 Proton exchange membrane fuel cell (PEMFC) a type of fuel cell based on a polymer electrolyte membrane.

 Protonic ceramic fuel cell
 Protonic ceramic fuel cell (PCFC) based on a ceramic electrolyte material that exhibits high protonic conductivity at elevated temperatures.

Q

R

 Reactor
 Reactor, see: bioreactor, membrane reactor and chemical reactor.

 Reagent
 A reagent or reactant is a substance or compound  consumed during a chemical reaction.

 Rectifier
  A rectifier is an electrical device that converts alternating current (AC) to direct current (DC), a process known as rectification.

 Redox
 Redox (shorthand for reduction-oxidation reaction) is any chemical reaction in which atoms have their oxidation number (oxidation state) changed.

 Reformate
 Reformate, hydrocarbon fuel that has been processed into hydrogen and other products for use in fuel cells.

 Reformed Methanol Fuel Cell
 Reformed methanol fuel cell (RMFC) or Indirect Methanol Fuel Cell (IMFC)s are a subcategory of proton-exchange fuel cells where, the fuel, methanol (CH3OH), is reformed, before being fed into the fuel cell.

 Reformer
 A hydrogen reformer another name for steam reforming a device that extracts hydrogen from other fuels, typically methanol or gasoline, not to be confused with the process catalytic reforming

 Reforming
 A chemical process in which hydrogen containing fuels react with steam, oxygen, or both to produce a hydrogen-rich gas stream. (syngas)

 Reformulated gasoline
 Gasoline that is blended so that, on average, it significantly reduces volatile organic compounds and air toxics emissions relative to conventional gasolines.

 Regenerative fuel cell
 A fuel cell that produces electricity from hydrogen and oxygen and can use electricity from solar power or some other source to divide the excess water into oxygen and hydrogen fuel to be re-used by the fuel cell. See Regenerative fuel cell.

 Relief valve
 The relief valve is a type of valve used to control or limit the pressure in a system or vessel which can build up by a process upset, instrument or equipment failure, or fire.

 Renewable energy
 Renewable energy is energy generated from natural resources—such as sunlight, Including solar and radiant energy, wind, rain, tides and geothermal heat—which are renewable (naturally replenished).

 Reservoir
 A reservoir is, most broadly, a place or hollow vessel where something fluid is kept in reserve, for later use.

 Response time
 In technology, response time is the time a system or functional unit takes to react to a given input.

 Reversible fuel cell
 Reversible fuel cell (RFC), a fuel cell that can consume chemical A to produce electricity and chemical B and be reversed to consume electricity and chemical B to produce chemical A.

 Reynolds number
 In fluid mechanics and heat transfer, the Reynolds number  is a dimensionless number that gives a measure of the ratio of inertial forces to viscous forces and, consequently, it quantifies the relative importance of these two types of forces for given flow conditions.

 Rupture disc
 A rupture disk or bursting disc is a pressure relief device that protects a vessel or system from overpressurization.

 Ruthenium
 Ruthenium is used in Platinum-Ruthenium electrodes for Methanol-fuel cells

S

 Safety shutoff valve
 Safety shut-off valves are safety valves used to close a line and stop the flow of material.

 Safety valve
 A safety valve is a valve mechanism for the automatic release of a gas from a boiler, pressure vessel, or other system when the pressure or temperature exceeds preset limits.

 Salt bridge
 A salt bridge, in chemistry, is a laboratory device used to connect the oxidation and reduction half-cells of a galvanic cell (voltaic cell), a type of electrochemical cell. Salt bridge usually comes in two types: glass tube and filter paper.

 Scrubber
 Scrubber systems are a diverse group of air pollution control devices that can be used to remove some particulates and/or gases from industrial exhaust streams.

 Sensor
 A sensor is a device that measures a physical quantity and converts it into a signal which can be read by an observer or by an instrument.

 Series circuit
 Series circuits are sometimes called current-coupled or daisy chain-coupled. The current that flows in a series circuit has to flow through every component in the circuit. Therefore, all of the components in a series connection carry the same current. It has been noted that current flows in series.

 Service life
 A product's service life is its expected lifetime, or the acceptable period of use in service. It is the time that any manufactured item can be expected to be 'serviceable' or supported by its originating manufacturer.

 Short circuit
 A short circuit (sometimes abbreviated to short or s/c) allows a current along a different path from the one intended.

 Sodium borohydride
 Sodium borohydride, also known as sodium tetrahydroborate, has the chemical formula NaBH4.

 Solenoid valve
 A solenoid valve is an electromechanical valve for use with liquid or gas controlled by running or stopping an electric current through a solenoid, which is a coil of wire, thus changing the state of the valve.

 Solid oxide electrolyser cell
 A solid oxide electrolyser cell (SOEC) is a solid oxide fuel cell set in regenerative mode for the electrolysis of water with a solid oxide, or ceramic, electrolyte to produce oxygen and hydrogen gas.

 Solid oxide fuel cell
 A solid oxide fuel cell (SOFC) is an electrochemical conversion device that produces electricity directly from oxidizing a fuel.

 Solubility
 Solubility is the ability of a given substance, the solute, to dissolve in a solvent.

 Sorbent
 A sorbent is a material used to adsorb either liquids or gases.

 Sorption
 Sorption is the action of both absorption and adsorption takes place simultaneously.

 Specific gravity

 Specific heat capacity
 Specific heat capacity, also known simply as specific heat, is the measure of the heat energy required to increase the temperature of a unit quantity

 Specific power
 In engineering, the specific power is power either per unit of mass, volume, or area.

 Specific weight
 The specific weight (also known as the unit weight) is the weight per unit volume of a material

 Stack
 Stack, to deliver the desired amount of energy, the fuel cells can be combined in series and parallel circuits, where series yield higher voltage, and parallel allows a stronger current to be drawn. Such a design is called a fuel cell stack.

 Standard cubic foot
 A standard cubic foot (SFC) is a measure of quantity of gas, equal to a cubic foot of volume at 60 degrees Fahrenheit and either 14.696 pounds-force per square inch (1 atm or 101.325 kPa) or 14.73 psi (30 inHg or 101.6 kPa) of pressure.

 Standard electrode potential
 In electrochemistry, the standard electrode potential, abbreviated Eo, E0, or EO (with a superscript plimsoll character, pronounced nought), is the measure of individual potential of a reversible electrode (at equilibrium) at standard state, which is with solutes at an effective concentration of 1 mol/kg, and gases at a pressure of 1 atmosphere / 100 kPa (kilopascals).

 Stationary fuel cell applications
 Stationary fuel cell applications (or stationary fuel cell power systems) are stationary (not moving) fuel cell applications

 Steady state
 Steady state is a more general situation than dynamic equilibrium. If a system is in steady state, then the recently observed behavior of the system will continue into the future.

 SMR
 Steam methane reforming (SMR) another name for steam reforming

 Steam reforming
 Steam reforming (SR), hydrogen reforming or catalytic oxidation, is a method of producing hydrogen from hydrocarbons at high temperatures (700 – 1100 °C) in the presence of a metal-based catalyst (nickel).

 Switched-mode power supply
 A switched-mode power supply, switching-mode power supply or SMPS, is an electronic power supply unit (PSU) that incorporates a switching regulator.

 Syngas
 Syngas (from synthesis gas) is the name given to a gas mixture that contains varying amounts of carbon monoxide and hydrogen generated by the gasification of a carbon-containing fuel to a gaseous product with a heating value.

T

 Tafel equation
 The Tafel equation relates the rate of an electrochemical reaction to the overpotential.

 Tail gas combustor
 Tail gas combustor (TGC)

 Tar
 Tar is a viscous black liquid derived from the destructive distillation of organic matter.

 Technology assessment
 Technology assessment (TA, German Technikfolgenabschätzung) is the study and evaluation of new technologies.

 Technology life cycle
 The technology maturity lifecycle is the commercial gain of a product from its research and development phase to its vital life phase before it becomes outdated and replaced.  More mature technology has been tested and tweaked so as to reduce faults and flaws

 Technology readiness level
 Technology readiness level (TRL) is a measure used by some United States government agencies and many of the world's major companies (and agencies) to assess the maturity of evolving technologies (materials, components, devices, etc.) prior to incorporating that technology into a system or subsystem.

 Technology validation
 Technology validation, confirming that technical targets for a given technology have been met.

 Temperature
 Temperature is  a physical property of a system that underlies the common notions of hot and cold

 Terbium
  Terbium is used as a crystal stabilizer of fuel cells which operate at elevated temperatures, together with ZrO2.

 Thermal conductivity
 In physics, thermal conductivity, is the property of a material that indicates its ability to conduct heat.

 Thermal efficiency
 In thermodynamics, the thermal efficiency is a dimensionless performance measure of a thermal device

 Thermal expansion
 When the temperature of a substance changes, the energy that is stored in the intermolecular bonds between atoms changes. When the stored energy increases, so does the length of the molecular bonds. As a result, solids typically expand in response to heating and contract on cooling; this dimensional response to temperature change is expressed by its coefficient of thermal expansion.

 Thermal partial oxidation
 Thermal partial oxidation (TPOX) is a thermal partial oxidation reaction, which is dependent on the air-fuel ratio, proceed at temperatures of 1200°C and above.

 Thermoelectricity
 Thermoelectricity is a class of phenomena in which a temperature difference creates an electric potential or an electric potential creates a temperature difference.

 Thermoplastic
 A thermoplastic is a plastic that  melts to a liquid when heated and freezes to a brittle, very glassy state when cooled sufficiently.

 Thermoplastic elastomer
 Thermoplastic elastomers (TPE), sometimes referred to as thermoplastic rubbers, are a class of copolymers or a physical mix of polymers (usually a plastic and a rubber) which consist of materials with both thermoplastic and elastomeric properties.

 Transducer
 A transducer is a device, usually electrical, electronic, electro-mechanical,  electromagnetic, photonic, or photovoltaic that converts one type of energy or physical attribute to another for various purposes including measurement or information transfer (for example, pressure sensors).

 Transfer switch
 A transfer switch allows switching from a primary power source to a secondary or tertiary power source and are employed in some electrical power distribution systems.

 Transformer
 A transformer is a device that transfers electrical energy from one circuit to another through inductively coupled electrical conductors.

 Triple phase boundary
 Triple phase boundary (TPB)

 Triple point
 In thermodynamics, the triple point of a substance is the temperature and pressure at which three phases (for example, gas, liquid, and solid) of that substance coexist in thermodynamic equilibrium.

 Turbine
 A turbine is a rotary engine that extracts energy from a fluid flow.

 Turbocharger
 Turbocharger, a device used for increasing the pressure and density of a fluid entering a fuel cell power plant using a compressor driven by a turbine that extracts energy from the exhaust gas.

 Turbocompressor
 Turbocompressor, a machine for compressing air or other fluid (reactant if supplied to a fuel cell system) in order to increase the reactant pressure and concentration.

U

 Ullage
 Ullage is the unfilled space in a container of liquid.

 Uninterruptible power supply
 An uninterruptible power supply (UPS), also known as a continuous power supply (CPS) is a device which maintains a continuous supply of electric power to connected equipment by supplying power from a separate source when utility power is not available.

 Unitized regenerative fuel cell
 A unitized regenerative fuel cell (URFC) is a fuel cell based on the proton exchange membrane which can do the electrolysis of water in regenerative mode and function in the other mode as a fuel cell recombining oxygen and hydrogen gas to produce electricity.

V

 Vacuum pump
 A vacuum pump is a device that removes gas molecules from a sealed volume in order to leave behind a partial vacuum.

 Vapor–liquid equilibrium
 Vapor–liquid equilibrium, abbreviated as VLE by some, is a condition where a liquid and its vapor (gas phase) are in equilibrium with each other, a condition or state where the rate of evaporation (liquid changing to vapor) equals the rate of condensation (vapor changing to liquid) on a molecular level such that there is no net (overall) vapor-liquid interconversion.

 Vapor pressure
 Vapor pressure (also known as equilibrium vapor pressure or saturation vapor pressure), is the pressure of a vapor in equilibrium with its non-vapor phases.

 Vapor recovery
 Vapor recovery (or vapour) recovery is the process of recovering the vapors of gasoline or other fuels, so that they do not escape into the atmosphere.

 Voltage
 Electrical tension (or voltage after its SI unit, the volt) is the difference of electrical potential between two points of an electrical or electronic circuit, expressed in volts.

 Voltage converter
 A voltage converter changes the voltage of an electrical power source and is usually combined with other components to create a power supply.

 Voltage drop
 Voltage drop is the reduction in voltage in an electrical circuit between the source and load.

 Voltage regulator
 A voltage regulator is an electrical regulator designed to automatically maintain a constant voltage level.

 Volumetric energy density
 Volumetric energy density, potential energy in a given volume of fuel.

 Volumetric flow rate
 The volumetric flow rate in fluid dynamics and hydrometry, (also known as volume flow rate or rate of fluid flow) is the volume of fluid which passes through a given surface per unit time (for example cubic meters per second [m3 s−1] in SI units, or cubic feet per second [cu ft/s]). It is usually represented by the symbol Q.

 Volumetric heat capacity
 Volumetric heat capacity (VHC) is the ability of a given volume of a substance to store internal energy while undergoing a given temperature change, but without undergoing a phase transition.

W

 Water
 Water (H2O) in typical usage, water refers only to its liquid form or state, but the substance also has a solid state, ice, and a gaseous state, water vapor or steam.

 Water gas shift reaction
 The water gas shift reaction (WGS) is a chemical reaction in which carbon monoxide reacts with water to form carbon dioxide and hydrogen

 Water purification
 Water purification is the process of removing contaminants and other harmful microorganisms from a raw water source.

 Water vapor
 Water vapor or water vapour (see spelling differences), also aqueous vapor, is the gas phase of water.

 Watt
 The watt (symbol: W) is the SI derived unit of power, equal to one joule of energy per second. It measures a rate of energy use or production.

 Wet basis
 It is customary to report the product composition data in steam reforming reactions on a steam free basis (dry basis) since the steam is not a constituent in any of the synthesis gases produced or in the reformed gas when used as a fuel; however, if steam is to be considered in the product composition data as well, then the calculation would be wet basis.

 W/kg
 Kilowatts per kilogram (generally, W/kg).The power per unit of mass in relation to the power-to-weight ratio.

 Wt.%
 In hydrogen storage research, weight percent (wt.%, also called mass percent) is the amount of hydrogen stored on a weight basis. This can apply to materials that store hydrogen or for the entire storage system (e.g., material or compressed/liquid hydrogen as well as the tank and other equipment required to contain the hydrogen such as insulation, valves, regulators, etc.). For example, 6 wt.% on a system-basis means that 6% of the entire system by weight is hydrogen. On a material basis, the wt.% is the mass of hydrogen divided by the mass of material plus hydrogen.

X

Y

 Yttria-stabilized zirconia
 Yttria-stabilized zirconia (YSZ) is a zirconium-oxide based ceramic

Z

 Zinc-air battery
 A Zinc-air battery (non-rechargeable), and zinc-air fuel cells, (mechanically-rechargeable) are electro-chemical batteries powered by the oxidation of zinc with oxygen from the air.

 Zinc oxide
 Zinc oxide is a chemical compound with the formula ZnO. (sulfur sorbent)

Acronyms

References

Fuel cell terms
 
Wikipedia glossaries using description lists